Cochylis bana is a species of moth of the  family Tortricidae. It is found in North America, where it has been recorded from Florida, Indiana, Maryland, Massachusetts, Ohio, Oklahoma and Ontario.

The wingspan is 10–12 mm. Adults are on wing in April and from June to September.

References

Moths described in 1907
Cochylis